Noordeloos is a town in the Dutch province of South Holland.

In 2013, the town of Noordeloos had 1816 inhabitants. The built-up area of the town was 0.14 km2, and contained 300 residences.
The statistical area "Noordeloos", which also can include the peripheral parts of the village, as well as the surrounding countryside, has a population of around 370.

Noordeloos was a separate municipality until 1986, when it became part of Giessenlanden.

Noordeloos is also the name of a small community in Ottawa County, Michigan.  It was created in the mid-1800s by Dutch settlers (who, at the time were also settling in nearby Holland and Zeeland) and was named after the original Dutch town.

References

Populated places in South Holland
Former municipalities of South Holland
Molenlanden